Bayerbach is a municipality in the district of Rottal-Inn in Bavaria in Germany.

References

External links 

 Website of the municipality
 

Rottal-Inn